Alexander McNab (27 December 1911 – 12 September 1962) was a Scottish footballer. Although not seen as one of the most important members of the squad in his time at Sunderland, he had a role in two of their greatest successes: he was on the pitch for the league championship clincher in 1936, and replaced injured captain Alex Hastings in the 1937 FA Cup Final. He also won the 1936 FA Charity Shield.

In 1938, McNab joined West Bromwich Albion for a fee of £7,000 but war intervened and he went to various clubs on loan including Nottingham Forest, Northampton Town and Walsall. He eventually signed for Newport County in 1946. McNab later played for Dudley Town and managed Northwich Victoria from 1948 to 1949 before eventually retiring in 1952.

References

1911 births
1962 deaths
Scottish footballers
English Football League players
Sunderland A.F.C. players
West Bromwich Albion F.C. players
Newport County A.F.C. players
Nottingham Forest F.C. wartime guest players
Northwich Victoria F.C. managers
Walsall F.C. wartime guest players
Northampton Town F.C. wartime guest players
Scotland international footballers
Dudley Town F.C. players
Scottish football managers
Association football wing halves
Pollok F.C. players
Scottish Junior Football Association players
Footballers from Glasgow
FA Cup Final players